Lee William Tockar (born February 11, 1969) is a Canadian voice actor and visual artist who works for several studios in Vancouver, British Columbia, Canada. He is also a writer of children's literature, a musician, sculptor, illustrator and collected painter. Tockar is best known for his work on My Little Pony: Friendship is Magic (as Snips and at least 8 other roles), Eugene "Bling Bling Boy" Hamilton in Johnny Test, George in George of the Jungle, Doktor Frogg on League of Super Evil, the titular character of Yakkity Yak, the evil Makuta Teridax in the Bionicle films and Fidgel from 3-2-1 Penguins!. He also founded FanBuilt.com.

Early life
At the age of five, Tockar told his mother that he wanted to "grow up to be a cartoon". Tockar did not initially understand the concept of a cartoon when he made the statement. At the age of ten, Tockar won first place in a talent show for his vocal impersonations of Kermit the Frog and Bugs Bunny. At the age of 12, Tockar won his first public speaking award for reading a two-thousand word essay on horror films. During his teenage years, before graduating from Kelowna Secondary School, Lee opened a graphic arts business which enabled him to travel around British Columbia and paint wall murals for restaurants. In 1988, he won the British Columbia Playwright competition for his original work, "Confessions", which was performed at the Waterfront Theatre on Granville Island in Vancouver, British Columbia. A year later in 1989, he was runner-up for his second play, "You Obviously Weren't Listening". In 2008, Tockar was presented with the 2008 Electronic Animation Award for "Best Male Voice-over Artist of the Year" for his portrayal of George in George of the Jungle; the award was handed to him by Family Guy creator and actor Seth MacFarlane.

Career
Tockar is signed under the Alliance of Canadian Cinema, Television and Radio Artists and the Union of British Columbia Performers. Tockar was nominated for the 2012 UBCP/ACTRA Best Voice award. He is the president of Multi Mania Entertainment Incorporated and a co-artistic producer, writer and creator for Holy Molee Entertainment Incorporated. He is also the founding creator and CEO of Fanbuilt Productions. Tockar currently resides in Vancouver, British Columbia.

In 2012, Tockar announced a new project, called FanBuilt, where animators and producers can collaborate on major projects and compete for prizes.

References

External links
 
 
 

Living people
20th-century Canadian male actors
21st-century Canadian male actors
Animal impersonators
Canadian blind people
Blind actors
Canadian Christians
Canadian male television writers
Canadian male voice actors
Canadian male screenwriters
Canadian television writers
1969 births
21st-century Canadian screenwriters
21st-century Canadian male writers